Albert Ludwig (November 14, 1919 – February 16, 2019) was a Canadian politician and World War II combat veteran, lawyer, judge and author from Alberta.

Early life
Ludwig was born in 1919 in Melfort, Saskatchewan. Ludwig joined the Canadian Army in 1940, and transferred to the Royal Canadian Air Force in 1941. Albert was forced to abandon his plane over France.

Political career
Ludwig served as a member of the Legislative Assembly of Alberta for the Social Credit Party of Alberta through four terms from 1959 to 1975. As Minister of Public Works, Ludwig led efforts on behalf of the Government of Alberta to preserve Rutherford House following the University of Alberta's decision to demolish the historic home. Ludwig was nominated in the 1975 Alberta general election but due to his wife's terminal illness that year he did not campaign and therefore lost the election to John Kushner. After this election he left politics to practice law.

Ludwig did not limit himself to provincial politics. He ran twice federally in Calgary East for the Liberal Party of Canada, he lost both times again to John Kushner who also left provincial politics to run federally. After failing to gain office federally he was appointed as a Judge to the Provincial Criminal Court of Alberta and served that position from 1980 until his retirement 1989.

Ludwig was nominated as the Liberal candidate in Calgary Foothills only days before the 1997 Alberta general election but was unable to regain a seat in the legislature and was defeated by incumbent Pat Black.

Ludwig was also a co-author of The Canadian Creed, along with Robert E. Kulhawy He died in February 2019 at the age of 99.

References

Canadian Creed

External links
Albert Ludwig WWII experiences
Canadian Creed by Albert Ludwig

1919 births
2019 deaths
Alberta Social Credit Party MLAs
Canadian military personnel of World War II
Candidates in the 1979 Canadian federal election
Candidates in the 1980 Canadian federal election
People from Melfort, Saskatchewan
Members of the Executive Council of Alberta
Liberal Party of Canada candidates for the Canadian House of Commons